WBHN is a Classic Country formatted broadcast radio station licensed to Bryson City, North Carolina, serving Swain County in North Carolina.  WBHN is owned and operated by Roy Burnette.

References

External links
 94.1 Classic Country Online

1967 establishments in North Carolina
Classic country radio stations in the United States
Radio stations established in 1967
BHN